Erkki Rajamäki (born October 30, 1978) is a Finnish former professional ice hockey left winger and currently a scout for the Boston Bruins of the NHL. He was previously a scout for the Pittsburgh Penguins from 2013 to 2015.

Career stats

References

External links 
 

1978 births
Boston Bruins scouts
Colgate Raiders men's ice hockey players
Espoo Blues players
Finnish ice hockey left wingers
HIFK (ice hockey) players
HPK players
Ice Hockey Superleague players
Ilves players
Living people
Newcastle Jesters players
Sportspeople from Vantaa
Peoria Rivermen (AHL) players
Pittsburgh Penguins scouts
Tampa Bay Lightning draft picks
Utah Grizzlies (ECHL) players
Worcester IceCats players